Yorqin Nazarov (born 11 October 1974) is a retired Uzbekistan international footballer, who played as a midfielder.

Career statistics

International

References

1974 births
Living people
Uzbekistani footballers
Uzbekistan international footballers
Uzbekistani expatriate footballers
Kazakhstan Premier League players
FC Bunyodkor players
Expatriate footballers in Kazakhstan
Uzbekistani expatriate sportspeople in Kazakhstan
Association football midfielders
Uzbekistan Super League players
Vasco SC players
Muktijoddha Sangsad KC players